David Pérez Arteaga (born 1 December 1981) is a Spanish retired professional footballer who played as a central midfielder.

Club career
Arteaga was born in Seville, Andalusia. Having spent most of his career with clubs in his native region, mostly in the second division, he made four La Liga appearances for Sevilla FC in two separate seasons in the early 2000s.

Arteaga also represented Recreativo de Huelva, Atlético Madrid B, Algeciras CF, Écija Balompié, Córdoba CF and CE Sabadell FC, alternating between the second and the third levels. He retired at the end of the 2013–14 campaign whilst at the service of the last team, aged 32.

External links

1981 births
Living people
Spanish footballers
Footballers from Seville
Association football midfielders
La Liga players
Segunda División players
Segunda División B players
Sevilla Atlético players
Sevilla FC players
Recreativo de Huelva players
Atlético Madrid B players
Algeciras CF footballers
Écija Balompié players
Córdoba CF players
CE Sabadell FC footballers